Washbourne may refer to:

 Washbourne, Devon, England, a hamlet
 Mona Washbourne (1903-1988), English actress
 Thomas Washbourne (1606-1687), English clergyman and poet

See also
 Great Washbourne, Gloucestershire, England, a village
 Little Washbourne, Gloucestershire, England, a village
 Washburn (disambiguation)